The Komala Kurdistan's Organization of the Communist Party of Iran is an Iranian Kurdish communist party active throughout the Iran–Iraq border. The party is led by Ibrahim Alizade and works as the Kurdish branch of Communist Party of Iran.

In 2009, a group of the party's cadre who identified only as socialists, left the party and established Socialist Faction of Komala.

Designation as a terrorist organization 
The following countries have listed Komola as a terrorist organization:

See also

References

1984 establishments in Iran
Banned Kurdish parties
Banned communist parties
Banned political parties in Iran
Communism in Kurdistan
Kurdish political parties in Iran
Political parties established in 1984
Organisations designated as terrorist by Iran
Organisations designated as terrorist by Japan
Marxist parties in Iran
Marxist parties in Iraq